Operation Smile China Medical Mission (OSCMM) is a non-profit organisation that provides reconstructive surgery for the underprivileged children with cleft lips and / or palates in China.

Chaired by Sir David Akers-Jones, OSCMM has provided over 26,000 free cleft surgeries to date since founded in 1991 in Hong Kong.  To enhance long-term capabilities of local medical professionals in China to treat cleft lip and palate, OSCMM also provides intensive resident and surgical training programmes.

The organisation receives support from worldwide volunteers and donors.

References

External links 
 Operation Smile China Medical Mission - official site

Non-profit organisations based in Hong Kong
Otorhinolaryngology organizations
Medical and health organizations based in China